Lei Peifan (born 31 May 2003) is a Chinese professional snooker player.

Career 
In May 2019, Lei came through Q School on the overall Order of Merit to earn a two-year card on the World Snooker Tour for the 2019–20 and 2020–21 seasons.

Performance and rankings timeline

Career finals

Amateur finals: 2

References

External links 
 Lei Peifan at worldsnooker.com

2003 births
Living people
Chinese snooker players
21st-century Chinese people